Charles Case (December 21, 1817 – June 30, 1883) was an American lawyer who served two terms as a U.S. Representative from Indiana from 1857 to 1861,

Biography
Case was born in Austinburg, Ohio; studied law; was admitted to the bar and commenced practice in Fort Wayne, Indiana.

Congress 
He was elected as a Republican to the Thirty-fifth United States Congress to fill the vacancy caused by the death of Samuel Brenton; reelected to the Thirty-sixth United States Congress and served from December 7, 1857, to March 3, 1861; unsuccessful candidate for reelection in 1860 to the Thirty-seventh United States Congress.

Later career and death 
During the Civil War, he served as first lieutenant and adjutant of the Forty-fourth Regiment, Indiana Volunteer Infantry; subsequently became a major in the Third Regiment, Indiana Volunteer Cavalry, and served from November 26, 1861, - August 15, 1862.

He later resumed the practice of his profession in Washington, D.C.

He died in Brighton, Washington County, Iowa; interment in the Congressional Cemetery, Washington, D.C.

Footnotes

Further reading

 Peggy Seigel, "Charles Case: A Radical Republican in the Irrepressible Conflict," Indiana Magazine of History, vol. 107, no. 4 (Dec. 2011), pp. 327–360. In JSTOR

External links
 

1817 births
1883 deaths
People from Austinburg, Ohio
Burials at the Congressional Cemetery
People of Indiana in the American Civil War
19th-century American politicians
Republican Party members of the United States House of Representatives from Indiana